Frozen Camp Wildlife Management Area is located on  in Jackson County near Ripley, West Virginia.    The hilly terrain is mostly covered with second-growth mixed hardwoods, with some open creek bottoms and ridgetops.

Hunting and fishing

Fishing opportunities are available in both the  Left Fork Lake and the  Right Fork Lake for largemouth bass, bluegill, and channel catfish.     Available hunting can include deer, rabbit, grouse,  squirrel, turkey and waterfowl.

Boating is permitted (electric motors only) on both of the small lakes.  A  shooting range is located on the WMA.  Camping is prohibited at Frozen Camp WMA land.

See also
Animal conservation
Fishing
Hunting
List of West Virginia wildlife management areas

References

Wildlife management areas of West Virginia
Protected areas of Jackson County, West Virginia